Randesund is a village and district within the city of Kristiansand in Agder county, Norway. The district is located within the borough of Oddernes along the southern coastline between the two fjords Kvåsefjorden and Topdalsfjorden and south of the districts of Søm and Hånes. There are several small islands just off the coast of Randesund, including Dvergsøya, Randøya, and Herøya, all popular tourist destinations. The village of Randesund is located in the central part of the district and it is the site of Randesund Church. There was a separate municipality of Randesund (larger than the present-day district) that existed from 1893 until 1965.

Name 
The district, (originally the parish) is named after the island, Randøen (now known as Randøya). The first part of the name is rand (Old Norse: rǫnd) which means "boundary" or "edge" and the last part of the name is sund which means "strait". The name was previously spelled Randøsund.

Politics 
The 10 largest politics parties in Randesund in 2015:

Transportation 

The main road to Tømmerstø is Norwegian County Road 3, which goes from Rona in Søm, to Drange. It goes through Tømmerstø. Norwegian County Road 9 goes from Dvergsnes, to Tangen both in Randesund. Norwegian County Road 4 goes from Bjørnestad to Kongshavn in Randesund. Norwegian County Road 14 goes from Frikstad to Stangenes. Norwegian County Road 401 goes from Randesund to Høvåg and Lillesand.

Neighborhoods 
 Bjørkestøl
 Butangen
 Drange
 Drangeskauen
 Dvergsnes
 Eftevåg
 Fidje
 Frikstad
 Hestehagen
 Holte
 Kirkevik
 Kongshavn
 Kvarnes
 Lykkedrag
 Odderhei
 Rabbersvik
 Skaupemyr
 Sommerro
 Stangenes
 Tømmerstø
 Tømmeråsen
 Vadvik
 Vrånes

Media gallery

References

External links 
 
 Weather information for Randesund 

Former municipalities of Norway
Villages in Agder
Populated places in Agder
Geography of Kristiansand
Boroughs of Kristiansand